Eupithecia tenuata is a moth in the family Geometridae first described by George Duryea Hulst in 1880. It is found in western North America from southern British Columbia through the Rocky Mountain region to Arizona and New Mexico.

The wingspan is about 16 mm. Adults are pale whitish. The forewings are marked with a small basal patch and a broad median band of a smoky-gray shade, which is much heavier in the costal half of the wing where it shows a strong outward bulge. Adults have been recorded on wing in July and August.

References

Moths described in 1880
tenuata
Moths of North America